Yamurikuma is a festival in which the women of some Xingu tribes participate in a sort of gender role reversal, wearing feather ornaments and ankle rattles normally worn by men. There are several physical competitions, including archery, swimming, carrying logs, running, and tug of war.

The festival culminates in a wrestling contest called Huka-huka. Wrestling matches usually only last for a few seconds until one opponent is either actually thrown down or 'thrown down' by default (when the other wrestler has grabbed both of her knees in such a way that it would inevitably lead to her being knocked to the ground).

External links
 http://www.fscclub.com/vidy/huka-e.shtml

Folk festivals in Brazil
Women's festivals
Cultural festivals in Brazil
Gender role reversal
Xingu peoples
Indigenous culture of the Amazon